Aphaniotis ornata is a species of lizard in the family Agamidae. The species is endemic to Borneo.

References

Further reading
Das I (2006). A Photographic Guide to Snakes and other Reptiles of Borneo. Sanibel Island, Florida: Ralph Curtis Books. 144 pp. . (Aphaniotis ornata, p. 75).
Lidth de Jeude TW (1893). "On Reptiles from North Borneo". Notes from the Leyden Museum 15: 250–257. (Japalura ornata, new species, p. 251).

Aphaniotis
Reptiles of Indonesia
Reptiles of Malaysia
Reptiles described in 1893
Taxa named by Theodorus Willem van Lidth de Jeude
Reptiles of Borneo